John "Jack" T. Jenkins was a Welsh rugby union and professional rugby league footballer who played in the 1900s and 1910s.

Playing career

International honors
Jack Jenkins won a cap for Wales (RL) while at Warrington in 1909.

Notable tour matches
Jack Jenkins played  in Warrington's 10-3 victory over Australia in the 1908–09 Kangaroo tour of Great Britain tour match during the 1908–09 season at Wilderspool Stadium, Warrington, Saturday 14 November 1908, in front of a crowd of 5,000, due to the strikes in the cotton mills, the attendance was badly affected, the loss of earnings meant that some fans could not afford to watch the first tour by the Australian rugby league team, and played and scored a try in the 8-8 draw with Australia in the 1908–09 Kangaroo tour of Great Britain tour match during the 1908–09 season at Wilderspool Stadium, Warrington, Monday 8 February 1909, in front of a crowd of 7,000.

Personal life
Jenkins' son Griff Jenkins, was also a rugby league footballer. He played for Warrington in the 1930s, and was appointed as Oldham's first ever coach in 1954.

References

External links
Statistics at wolvesplayers.thisiswarrington.co.uk

Llwynypia RFC players
Place of death missing
Rugby league five-eighths
Rugby league halfbacks
Rugby league players from Caerphilly County Borough
Rugby union players from Newbridge, Caerphilly
Wales national rugby league team players
Warrington Wolves players
Welsh rugby league players
Welsh rugby union players